Ad Majorem Sathanas Gloriam is the seventh studio album by Norwegian black metal band Gorgoroth. It was released in Europe on 19 June 2006 by Regain Records and in the US on 25 July 2006 by Candlelight Records. This was the only Gorgoroth album on which all of the lyrics and music were written by Gaahl and King ov Hell, and was the last to feature both members. It also marked the return of drummer Frost and was the last Gorgoroth album that he appeared on. It was nominated for Norway's 2006 Spellemann award in the "Metal" category. It is the first Gorgoroth album with no Norwegian lyrics.

In November 2007, Ad Majorem Sathanas Gloriam was reissued with a slightly different cover and a DVD containing the "Carving a Giant" music video and another video documenting how the album was recorded.

Title and artwork
The album title, a Latin term meaning "for the greater glory of Satan", was conceived by Infernus inspired by his reading an article about the Counter-Reformation, the Society of Jesus and Ignatius de Loyola. It is technically incorrectly translated; the accurate translation of Latin for "The Greater Glory of Satan" would be "Ad Majorem Sathanae Gloriam".

The cover artwork was taken from the 1850 painting Dante and Virgil by William-Adolphe Bouguereau.

Track listing

Personnel

Gorgoroth
 Gorgoroth – mixing in Bergen
 Gaahl – vocals
 Infernus – guitar; mastering 
 King ov Hell – bass
 Frost – session drums

Additional personnel
 Thomas Eberger – mastering

Engineering
 Geir Luedy – drums at Lydriket Studio, Bergen; January 2005
 Svein Solberg – guitar & bass at Steel Production Studio, Spydeberg; May 2005
 Herbrand Larsen – vocals and mixing at Earshot Studio, Bergen; March 2006

References 

Gorgoroth albums
2006 albums